
Pingnan may refer to the following locations in the People's Republic of China:

Counties
Pingnan County, Fujian (屏南县), in Ningde, Fujian
Pingnan County, Guangxi (平南县), in Guigang, Guangxi

Subdistricts
Pingnan Subdistrict, Siping (平南街道), in Tiedong District, Siping, Jilin
Pingnan Subdistrict, Pingnan County, Guangxi, in Pingnan County, Guangxi

Towns
Pingnan, Gansu (平南镇), in Tianshui, Gansu
Pingnan, Lingshan County (平南镇), in Lingshan County, Guangxi
Pingnan, Zhejiang (屏南镇), in Longquan, Zhejiang

Townships
Pingnan Township, Guangxi (屏南乡), in Hechi, Guangxi
Pingnan Qiang Ethnic Township (平南羌族乡), in Pingwu County, Sichuan